Kristjan is a masculine given name in the Estonian language and Slovenian language. It is a variation of the name Christian. Notable people named Kristjan include:

 Kristjan Čujec (born 1988), Slovenian futsal player
 Kristjan Fajt (born 1982), Slovenian professional road bicycle racer
 Kristjan Gregorič (born 1989), Slovenian track cyclist
 Kristjan Glibo (born 1982), German football defender and manager
 Kristjan Haho (1877–1937), Estonian lawyer, judge and politician
 Kristjan Ilves (born 1996), Estonian Nordic combined skier 
 Kristjan Järvan (born 1990), Estonian politician
 Kristjan Järvi (born 1972), Estonian-American conductor
 Kristjan Niels Julius (1860–1936), Icelandic-American satirical poet
 Kristjan Kais (born 1976), Estonian beach volleyball player
 Kristjan Kaljurand (born 1992), Estonian male badminton player
 Kristjan Kangur (born 1982), Estonian basketball player
 Kristjan Kitsing (born 1990), Estonian basketball player
 Kristjan Kõljalg (born 1982), Estonian politician
 Kristjan Kombe (born 2000), Estonian ice hockey player 
 Kristjan Lipovac (born 1989), Slovenian football goalkeeper
 Kristjan Lüüs (born 1991), Estonian actor
 Kristjan Makke (born 1981), Estonian basketball player
 Kristjan Oja (born 1968), Estonian biathlete
 Kristjan Õuekallas (born 1981), Estonian volleyball player
 Kristjan Palusalu (1908–1987), Estonian heavyweight wrestler
 Kristjan Jaak Peterson (1801–1822), Estonian poet
 Kristjan Prendi (born 1997), Albanian footballer
 Kristjan Rahnu (born 1979), Estonian decathlete
 Kristian Rand (born 1987), Estonian ice dancer
 Kristjan Raud (1865–1943), Estonian painter and drawer
 Kristjan Sarv (born 1979), Estonian actor, director and contemporary artist
 Kristjan Seaver (1898–1941), Estonian Communist politician
 Kristjan Sokoli (born 1991), American football defensive end
 Kristjan Tamm (born 1998), Estonian tennis player
 Kristjan Teder (1901–1960), Estonian painter

References

Estonian masculine given names
Slovene masculine given names